Freelance, in aerial, railway, naval, or bus model building, refers to companies that produce models that are not based on existing livery.
Such models are sometimes frowned upon in the model-building community because they do not represent existing items, but are original designs.

Because they require no licensing fees for trademark and design owners, and can thus be produced less expensively, freelance models are quite popular in the United States. They have not become popular in Europe, although a few European companies produce them.

Freelance companies

Railway 
 FTL - Ferrovie e Tranvie Locali - Local Railroads and Tramways
 Beetrains
 SAFF - Società Anonima Ferrovie Federate - Joint-stock company Federate Railroads
 So.Ge.R.I.T.
 SITAV Società Intermodale Trasporti Alta Valle - High Valley Intermodal Society Transport
 FRA Ferrovie Regionali dell'Appennino - Regional Railways of Apennine

Bus 
 SAFF - Società Anonima Ferrovie Federate - Joint-stock company Federate Railroads

Scale modeling